The women's javelin F35-38 event at the 2008 Summer Paralympics took place at the Beijing National Stadium at 19:20 on 10 September.
There was a single round of competition; after the first three throws, only the top eight had 3 further throws.
The competition was won by Wu Qing, representing .

Results

 
WR = World Record. SB = Seasonal Best.

References
 

Athletics at the 2008 Summer Paralympics
2008 in women's athletics